Archie Camden  (9 March 1888 – 16 February 1979) was a British bassoonist; he was a pedagogue and soloist of international acclaim.  His career began in 1906 when he joined the Hallé Orchestra, where he became principal bassoonist in 1914.  In 1933 he moved to the BBC Symphony Orchestra, where he stayed until 1946 when he took up the same position in the Royal Philharmonic Orchestra. Camden was also one of the first bassoonists to experiment with recording. His record of the Mozart bassoon concerto still remains one of the most popular today.

As a teacher, he was a professor of the bassoon at the Royal Manchester (now Northern) College of Music from 1914 to 1933; he later taught at the Royal College of Music in London. His most famous students included Roger Birnstingl, Michael Chapman, and Martin Gatt.  He also conducted the London Stock Exchange Orchestra.

In 1962, Camden published his book "Bassoon Technique."  He was awarded an OBE in 1969. Camden and his wife, Joyce had two boys who both went onto to study at the Royal School of Music, Kerry and Anthony Camden.

References

1888 births
1979 deaths
English classical bassoonists
Academics of the Royal College of Music
Officers of the Order of the British Empire
Place of birth missing
20th-century classical musicians